St Martin's Church, St Martin's is a Grade II listed parish church in the Church of England located in St Martin's, Isles of Scilly, UK.

History
The Anglican church was built in 1683 by Thomas Ekin, the Godolphin Steward. It was rebuilt in 1866 by Augustus Smith, after having been considerably damaged by lightning. The bell in the turret belonged to a vessel wrecked on the islands. There is a 20th-century extension at the west end.

The stained glass window at the east end depicts Saint Martin and the Beggar and is by Clayton and Bell. The church is a Grade II listed building.

There are three Commonwealth War Graves Commission memorials in the churchyard, marking the burial place of two sailors and a chaplin of the First World War. They commemorate the Third Mate A. Chichester of the Mercantile Marine S.S. "Lux." and Master W.S. Dobbing of the Mercantile Marine S.S. "Olaf.". Chichester and Dobbing both died in 1917 and the Reverend F. Raine (Chaplain 4th Class) of the Army Chaplains' Department who died in December 1918.

Parish structure

St Martin's Church is within the United Benefice of the Isles of Scilly parishes, comprising 
All Saints' Church, Bryher
St Agnes' Church, St Agnes
St Mary's Church, St Mary's
St Mary's Old Church, St Mary's
St Nicholas's Church, Tresco

Gallery

Sources
The Buildings of England, Cornwall. Nikolaus Pevsner

References

Church of England church buildings in the Isles of Scilly
Churches completed in 1683
19th-century Church of England church buildings
Grade II listed churches in Cornwall
1866 establishments in England
St Martin's, Isles of Scilly